The Greek name Paphnutius (Παφνούτιος) takes its origin in Egyptian pa-ph-nuti ("the [man] of God" or "that who belongs to God"; see the Coptic name "Papnoute").

People
 Paphnutius of Tentyra (3rd century AD), follower of a saint

Saints 
 Paphnutius of Thebes (4th century AD), aka "Paphnutius the Confessor", a bishop
 Paphnutius the Ascetic (4th century AD), aka "Paphnutius the Hermit"
 Hieromartyr Paphnutius of Jerusalem (284-305), who was martyred with 546 companions. See April 19 (Eastern Orthodox liturgics).
 Paphnutius, recluse of the Kiev Caves Monastery
 :; see List of Russian saints (until 15th century)
 Paphnutius the Bishop (10th century AD)

Other uses
 Paphnutius (play), a medieval play about the ascetic

Coptic given names